Bryne may refer to:

Places
 Bryne, a town in Time municipality in Rogaland county, Norway
 Bryne F.K., a football club in the town of Bryne
 Bryne Stadion, a stadium in the town of Bryne
 Bryne Church, a church in the town of Bryne

People
 Albertus Bryne, English organist and composer
 Barbara Bryne, American actress
 Gareth Bryne, fictional character in Robert Jordan's Wheel of Time fantasy series

Companies 

 Bryna Productions, also known as Brynaprod and The Bryna Company; a film production company formed by actor Kirk Douglas and named after his mother Bryna Demsky

See also
 Bryn (disambiguation)
 Byrne